This is the discography for American jazz band The Crusaders.

Albums as The Jazz Crusaders

Compilations as The Jazz Crusaders

Albums as Jazz Crusaders (Wayne Henderson & Wilton Felder)

Albums as The Crusaders

Compilations as The Crusaders

Singles as The Nite Hawks

Singles as The Night Hawks

Singles as The Jazz Crusaders

Singles as The Crusaders

References

Discographies of American artists
Jazz discographies